The Oklahoma Panhandle (formerly called No Man's Land, the Public Land Strip, the Neutral Strip, or  Cimarron Territory) is a salient in the extreme northwestern region of the U.S. state of Oklahoma, consisting of Cimarron County, Texas County and Beaver County, from west to east. As with other salients in the United States, its name comes from the similarity of its shape to the handle of a pan.

The three-county Oklahoma Panhandle region had a population of 28,751 at the 2010 U.S. Census, representing 0.77% of the state's population. This is a decrease in total population of 1.2%, a loss of 361 people, from the 2000 U.S. Census.

Geography

The largest town in the region is Guymon, which is the county seat of Texas County. The Panhandle occupies nearly all of the true High Plains within Oklahoma, being the only part of the state lying west of the 100th meridian, which generally marks the westernmost extent of moist air from the Gulf of Mexico. The North Canadian River is named Beaver River or Beaver Creek on its course through the Panhandle. The area includes Beaver Dunes State Park with sand dunes along the Beaver River and Optima Lake, the home of the Optima National Wildlife Refuge.

History

What is now the Oklahoma Panhandle has been occupied for millennia. The Paleo-Indian people of the region were part of the Beaver River complex. A Paleo-Indian encampment, the Bull Creek site, dates back to approximately 8450 BCE, and the Badger Hole site dates to circa 8400 BCE.

Shortly before the arrival of European explorers, the Panhandle was home to Southern Plains villagers. From 1200 to 1500, the semi-sedentary Panhandle culture peoples, including the Antelope Creek phase, lived in the region in large, stone-slab and plaster houses in villages or individual homesteads. As horticulturists, they farmed maize and indigenous crops from the Eastern Agricultural Complex. Several Antelope Creek phase sites were founded near present-day Guymon, including the McGrath, Stamper and Two Sisters sites. The arrival of horses from Spain in the 16th century, allowed American Indian tribes to increase their hunting ranges. These Southern Plains villagers became the Wichita and Affiliated Tribes.

The Western history of the Panhandle traces its origins as being part of New Spain. The Adams–Onís Treaty of 1819 between Spain and the United States set the western boundary of this portion of the Louisiana Purchase at the 100th meridian. With Mexican independence in 1821, these lands became part of Mexico. With the formation of the Texas Republic, they became part of Texas. When Texas joined the U.S. in 1846, the strip became part of the United States.

The Cimarron Cutoff for the Santa Fe Trail passed through the area soon after the trade route was established in 1826 between the Mexicans in Santa Fe and the Americans in St. Louis. The route was increasingly used during the California Gold Rush. The cutoff passed several miles north of what are now Boise City, Oklahoma, and Clayton, New Mexico, before continuing toward Santa Fe.

When Texas sought to enter the Union in 1845 as a slave state, federal law in the United States, based on the Missouri Compromise, prohibited slavery north of 36°30' parallel north. Under the Compromise of 1850, Texas surrendered its lands north of 36°30' latitude. The 170-mile strip of land, a "neutral strip", was left with no state or territorial ownership from 1850 until 1890. It was officially called the "Public Land Strip" and was commonly referred to as "No Man's Land."

The Compromise of 1850 also established the eastern boundary of New Mexico Territory at the 103rd meridian, thus setting the western boundary of the strip. The Kansas–Nebraska Act of 1854 set the southern border of Kansas Territory as the 37th parallel. This became the northern boundary of "No Man's Land." When Kansas joined the Union in 1861, the western part of Kansas Territory was assigned to the Colorado Territory but did not change the boundary of "No Man's Land."

Cimarron Territory
After the Civil War, cattlemen moved into the area. Gradually they organized themselves into ranches and established their own rules for arranging their land and adjudicating their disputes. There was still confusion over the status of the strip, and some attempts were made to arrange rent with the Cherokees, despite the fact that the Cherokee Outlet ended at the 100th meridian. In 1885, the U. S. Supreme Court ruled that the strip was not part of the Cherokee Outlet.  In 1886, Interior Secretary L. Q. C. Lamar declared the area to be public domain and subject to "squatter's rights".

The strip was not yet surveyed, and as that was one of the requirements of the Homestead Act of 1862, the land could not be officially settled. Settlers by the thousands flooded in to assert their "squatter's rights" anyway. They surveyed their own land and by September 1886 had organized a self-governing and self-policing jurisdiction, which they named the Cimarron Territory. Senator Daniel W. Voorhees of Indiana introduced a bill in Congress to attach the so-called territory to Kansas. It passed both the Senate and the House of Representatives but was not signed by President Grover Cleveland.

The organization of Cimarron Territory began soon after Secretary Lamar declared the area open to settlement by squatters. The settlers formed their own vigilance committees, which organized a board charged with forming a territorial government. The board enacted a preliminary code of law and divided the strip into three districts. They also called for a general election to choose three members from each district to form a government.

The elected council met as planned, elected Owen G. Chase as president, and named a full cabinet. They also enacted further laws and divided the strip into five counties (Benton, Beaver, Palo Duro, Optima, and Sunset), three senatorial districts (with three members from each district), and seven delegate districts (with two members from each district). The members from these districts were to be the legislative body for the proposed territory. Elections were held November 8, 1887, and the legislature met for the first time on December 5, 1887.

Chase went to Washington, D.C., to lobby for admission to Congress as the delegate from the new territory.  He was not recognized by Congress.  A group disputing the Chase organization met and elected and sent its own delegate to Washington. A bill was introduced to accept Chase but was never brought to a vote. Neither delegation was able to persuade Congress to accept the new territory. Another delegation went in 1888 but was also unsuccessful.

Settlement and assimilation
In 1889, the Unassigned Lands to the east of the territory were opened for settlement, and many of the residents went there. The remaining population was generously estimated by Chase at 10,000 after the opening. Ten years later, an actual count revealed a population of 2,548. The passage of the Organic Act in 1890 assigned Public Land Strip to the new Oklahoma Territory, and ended the short-lived Cimarron Territory aspirations.

In 1891, the government completed the survey, and the remaining squatters were finally able to secure their homesteads under the Homestead Act. The new owners were then able to obtain mortgages against their property, enabling them to buy seed and equipment. Capital and new settlers came into the area, and the first railroad, the Rock Island, built a line through the county from Liberal, Kansas, to Dalhart, Texas. Agriculture began changing from subsistence farms to grain exporters.

"No Man's Land" became Seventh County under the newly organized Oklahoma Territory and was soon renamed Beaver County. Beaver City became the county seat. When Oklahoma Territory and Indian Territory were combined in 1907 as the state of Oklahoma, Beaver County was divided into Beaver, Texas, and Cimarron counties. The Oklahoma Panhandle had the highest population at its first census in 1910, 32,433 residents, compared to 28,729 in the 2020 census.

Dust Bowl
The Panhandle was severely affected by the drought of the 1930s. The drought began in 1932 and created massive dust storms. By 1935, the area was widely known as being part of the Dust Bowl. The dust storms were largely a result of poor farming techniques and the plowing up of the native grasses that had held the fine soil in place. Despite government efforts to implement conservation measures and change the basic farming methods of the region, the Dust Bowl persisted for nearly a decade. It contributed significantly to the length of the Great Depression in the United States. Each of the three counties experienced a major loss of population during the 1930s.

The social impact of the dust bowl and the resulting emigration of tenant farmers from the Panhandle is the setting for the 1939 novel The Grapes of Wrath by Nobel prize-winning author John Steinbeck.

Demographics
As of the 2010 census, there were a total of 28,751 people, 10,451 households, and 7,466 families in the three counties that comprise the Oklahoma Panhandle. The racial makeup of the region was 80.26% white (including persons of mixed race), 59.46% non-Hispanic white, 1.34% African American, 1.21% Native American, 1.18% Asian, 0.12% Pacific Islander, 15.53% from other races, and 2.78% from two or more races. Hispanic and Latino Americans made up 35.85% of the population. The median income for a household in the region was $34,404, and the median income for a family was $40,006. Males had a median income of $27,444 versus $19,559 for females. The per capita income for the region was $16,447.

Cities and towns

Major communities
Beaver (county seat of Beaver County)
Boise City (county seat of Cimarron County)
Goodwell (home to Oklahoma Panhandle State University)
Guymon (county seat of Texas County and largest city in the Oklahoma Panhandle)
Hooker
Texhoma

Other communities
Adams
Balko
Felt
Forgan
Gate
Hardesty
Kenton
Keyes
Knowles
Optima
Turpin
Tyrone
Floris

Economy
The Panhandle is rather thinly populated (when compared to the rest of Oklahoma) making the labor force in this region very small. Farming and ranching operations occupy most of the economic activity in the region, with ranching dominating the drier western end. The region's higher educational needs are served by Oklahoma Panhandle State University in Goodwell, 10 miles southwest of Guymon.

Politics
The Oklahoma Panhandle is one of the most universally Republican areas of what has become one of the most Republican states in the nation. Beaver and Texas counties last supported a Democrat for president in 1948, while Cimarron County last supported a Democrat in 1976. In the 2020 U.S. presidential election, the three counties gave a weighted average of 85.1% of their votes to Donald Trump and 13.2% to Joe Biden, with Trump carrying the state over Biden 65.4% to 32.3%.

In the 2006 Oklahoma gubernatorial election, the Oklahoma Panhandle counties were the only three where the majority voted against the successfully reelected Democratic incumbent, Governor Brad Henry. In 2012, Democratic voters in the Panhandle voted for Randall Terry, an anti-abortion activist, over incumbent Democrat Barack Obama in the Democratic Presidential primary.

Points of interest
Black Mesa State Park features a hiking trail to the top of Oklahoma's highest point.
Beaver Dunes State Park features massive sand dunes along the Beaver River – located just north of the town of Beaver.
Optima Lake is home to the Optima National Wildlife Refuge.

Notes

References
Beck, T.E. "Cimarron Territory," Chronicles of Oklahoma 7:2 (June 1929) 168–169 (retrieved August 16, 2006).
Counties of the Oklahoma Panhandle United States Census Bureau
Wardell, Morris L. "The History of No-Man's Land, or Old Beaver County", Chronicles of Oklahoma 1:1 (January 1921) 60–89 (retrieved August 16, 2006).

Further reading
Christman, Harry E. (editor-original manuscript by Jim Herron). Fifty Years on the Owl Hoot Trail: The First Sheriff of No Man's Land, Oklahoma Territory. Sage Books: Chicago, 1969.
 Lowitt, Richard. American Outback: The Oklahoma Panhandle in the Twentieth Century (Texas Tech University Press, 2006) . xxii, 137 pp.

External links

Oklahoma article at HighBeam Encyclopedia.com
Oklahoma Panhandle was formerly called Cimarron Territory
Cimarron Council of the Boy Scouts of America
Oklahoma History Center: Education Programs
Encyclopedia of Oklahoma History and Culture – Cimarron Territory

 
Regions of Oklahoma
Pre-statehood history of Oklahoma
Geography of Beaver County, Oklahoma
Geography of Cimarron County, Oklahoma
Geography of Texas County, Oklahoma
1850 establishments in the United States
1890 disestablishments in the United States